Felix Sebastian Berenskötter (born July 1975) is a German political scientist who specializes in international relations theory, interpretivist approaches, concept analysis, European security, and transatlantic relations. He is a Senior Lecturer in International Relations and the former Head of Department of Politics and International Studies, SOAS University of London, and a member of the Governing Board of the European International Studies Association (EISA). Berenskötter serves as on the editorial board of the Journal of Global Security Studies and co-edites Bristol Studies in International Theory.

Biography 
Following undergraduate studies in University of Hamburg (1997-2000), Berenskötter received a Masters Degree from Rutgers University (2000-2002), where he was a Fulbright Scholar, and a PhD from the London School of Economics and Political Science (LSE) in 2008, where he was an editor of the journal Millennium: Journal of International Studies (2004-2006).

Before going to SOAS in 2009, Berenskötter was a research associate at the Department of War Studies, King's College London (2008-2009),  and a research fellow at the John Sloan Dickey Center for International Understanding, Dartmouth College (2007-2008). Berenskötter was a Visiting Fellow at the American Institute for Contemporary German Studies (AICGS), Johns Hopkins University in 2019. Before becoming Head of Department, Berenskötter was an associate editor of the Journal of Global Security Studies and co-convened the 'Interpretivism in International Relations' Working Group of the British International Studies Association (BISA). He is founder and former chair of the ‘Theory Section’ of the International Studies Association (ISA).

Berenskötter served as Head of the Department of Politics and International Studies, SOAS from July 2019 to January 2023.

Publications 
 Concepts in World Politics (2016, Sage)
 Power in World Politics , with Michael J. Williams (2007, Routledge)

External links

References 

Living people
1975 births
Alumni of the London School of Economics
Academics of SOAS University of London
German political scientists
German international relations scholars
University of Hamburg alumni
Rutgers University alumni
Johns Hopkins University fellows
Constructivist international relations scholars
German expatriates in England